The Winnipeg Jets are a professional ice hockey team based in Winnipeg. The team competes in the National Hockey League (NHL) as a member of the Central Division in the Western Conference, and is owned by True North Sports & Entertainment, playing its home games at Canada Life Centre.

The Jets were established as the Atlanta Thrashers on June 25, 1997, and began play in the 1999–2000 NHL season. True North Sports & Entertainment then bought the team in May 2011, and relocated the franchise to Winnipeg prior to the 2011–12 season, making them the first NHL franchise to relocate since the Hartford Whalers became the Carolina Hurricanes in 1997. The team was renamed the Jets after Winnipeg's original WHA/NHL team, which relocated after the 1995–96 season due to financial issues to become the Phoenix (later Arizona) Coyotes.

History

Original Winnipeg Jets (1972–1996)

On December 27, 1971, Winnipeg was granted one of the founding franchises in the World Hockey Association (WHA). By 1979, many of the WHA's teams had folded, but the Jets were absorbed into the NHL along with the Quebec Nordiques, Edmonton Oilers and Hartford Whalers as part of the WHA–NHL merger. Team owner Barry Shenkarow sold the team to American businessmen Steven Gluckstern and Richard Burke. Burke and Gluckstern originally planned to move the team to Minnesota (which had lost the North Stars to Dallas in 1993), but eventually reached an agreement with Phoenix businessman Jerry Colangelo that would see the team move to Arizona and become the Phoenix Coyotes. The original Winnipeg Jets played their last game on April 28, 1996.

Atlanta Thrashers (1999–2011)

The city of Atlanta was awarded an NHL expansion franchise, named the Atlanta Thrashers, on June 25, 1997. It was the second NHL franchise for Atlanta (their first being the Atlanta Flames, established in 1972, who departed for Calgary in 1980 to become the Calgary Flames). The Thrashers began play in the 1999–2000 season.

In the 12 years in Atlanta, the Thrashers qualified for the Stanley Cup playoffs once, during the 2006–07 season, and never won a playoff game. Partially due to their lack of playoff success, the team had difficulty drawing fans to attend their games in their final seasons.

Winnipeg Jets (2011–present)
Although they moved for financial reasons, the Coyotes have never been profitable in Arizona. Mounting losses eventually compelled the franchise to file for bankruptcy after the 2008–09 season. The team was taken over by the league before the next season began. As early as October 2009, there were rumours that True North Sports & Entertainment, the company that owns both Winnipeg's Canada Life Centre (then known as MTS Centre) and the American Hockey League (AHL)'s Manitoba Moose, had been invited to bid on the city's former franchise. TNSE submitted a series of bids for the Coyotes, which were taken seriously enough that the league drew up a tentative schedule with Winnipeg in place of Phoenix. The NHL shelved the bid after securing a large subsidy from the Coyotes' municipal government. In contrast to aggressive, public bids by Jim Balsillie (who had unsuccessfully attempted to use bankruptcy laws to skirt NHL rules and move the Coyotes to Hamilton), the low-key approach by TNSE and its chairman, Mark Chipman, was praised by NHL commissioner Gary Bettman and other owners, raising their profile when the question of the Thrashers' relocation came up.

On May 20, 2011, the Winnipeg Sun confirmed that an agreement in principle had been reached for True North to purchase the Thrashers, while Winnipeg Mayor Sam Katz announced that he was confident that the Thrashers' relocation to Winnipeg would soon be officially announced. On May 31, 2011, at a press conference at the MTS Centre, Bettman confirmed that the Atlanta Thrashers had been sold to True North and would relocate to Winnipeg for the 2011–12 season, pending the approval of the sale and relocation by the NHL's Board of Governors, which came at their June 21, 2011, meeting. The reported purchase price was $170 million, with $60 million going to the NHL as a relocation fee. After the announcement, True North made preparations to move the Moose franchise to St. John's, Newfoundland and Labrador.

Season ticket sales began June 1, 2011, with Manitoba Moose season ticket holders having priority. The team sought to sell 13,000 season tickets in an effort to prove its viability. Within the first three and a half hours, the new franchise sold 1,870 packages to Moose season ticket holders. Season tickets opened to the general public on June 4 and sold out in 17 minutes. Once the "Drive to 13,000" was completed, True North started a season ticket waiting list, which was shut down after 8,000 people signed up in two hours. In July 2011, tickets for October 9 home opener against the Montreal Canadiens were listed for an average price of $1,711 on StubHub, with an average selling price of $713.

True North said the team's name would not be announced until after the successful completion of the season ticket drive at the earliest. The team was not to be named the Thrashers, since True North did not acquire the name in the transaction, and the rights to that name and the Thrashers logo were retained by the ownership group in Atlanta.

There was considerable support in Winnipeg to reuse "Winnipeg Jets", the name of the city's original WHA and NHL franchise, though rumours spread that True North preferred "Manitoba Moose". "Whiteout" and "Falcons" were also considered, but the latter was quickly rejected in deference to Atlanta, which has another professional sports team by that name. True North kept their selection secret until the 2011 NHL Entry Draft in St. Paul, Minnesota, on June 24, when Chipman introduced General Manager Kevin Cheveldayoff to "make our first pick, on behalf of the Winnipeg Jets."

Before the franchise relocation was officially completed, True North bought out the remaining years of General Manager Rick Dudley's contract on June 4, 2011. Thrashers President Don Waddell, who had been with the franchise since its inception, had earlier announced he would not be moving with the team. Kevin Cheveldayoff, a former GM of the Chicago Wolves and former assistant GM of the Chicago Blackhawks, was hired to replace Dudley four days later. The team also retained Marcel Comeau, the director of amateur scouting. On June 12, 2011, Cheveldayoff had Thrashers Head Coach Craig Ramsay reinterview for his position, then formally dismissed him as head coach eight days later. Claude Noel, who had been the head coach of the Manitoba Moose, was named head coach four days later; the other finalist for the job had been Chicago Blackhawks Assistant Coach Mike Haviland. Charlie Huddy, Pascal Vincent and Wade Flaherty, formerly of the Dallas Stars and Blackhawks, were named Noel's assistant coaches.

The Jets made their formal regular season debut on October 9, 2011, when a sellout crowd at the MTS Centre saw the visiting Montreal Canadiens defeat the Jets 5–1, with Nik Antropov scoring the first-ever Jets goal. The opening ceremonies featured a concert by Winnipeg-based rock band Bachman–Turner Overdrive, who performed "You Ain't Seen Nothing Yet" with the title sung as "we just got back the Jets". Other highlights on the first Jets schedule included a home-and-home set with the Phoenix Coyotes, Winnipeg's previous NHL franchise (including a December 1 game in Winnipeg, the Coyotes' first regular season appearance in Winnipeg since vacating the city), as well as a December 17 home game against the Anaheim Ducks, which was former Jet Teemu Selanne's first playing appearance in Winnipeg since being traded from the Jets in February 1996.

During the summer of 2012, the Jets added Perry Pearn to their coaching staff. Larry Simmons was appointed assistant general manager, the same position he had held with the Thrashers. As the Jets inherited the Thrashers' position in the Southeast Division since the 2011–12 season, the NHL and National Hockey League Players' Association (NHLPA) were prompted to consider realignment of teams. Beginning in 2013–14, the Jets moved to the Western Conference and play in the new-look, seven-team Central Division.

The Jets fired Noel and Pearn in January 2014, with the former being replaced by veteran coach Paul Maurice. On April 9, 2015, the Jets clinched their first Stanley Cup playoff appearance since relocating to Winnipeg following a 1–0 shootout loss to the Colorado Avalanche. They clinched the spot after the Calgary Flames defeated the Los Angeles Kings later in the night. Finishing the season in the second wild-card spot, they played the top-seeded Anaheim Ducks in the first round. In the first playoff series that involved a team from Winnipeg since the 1996 playoffs, the Ducks swept the Jets in four games.

The season following their first playoff run was a disappointment, as the Jets finished 25th overall, well out of the playoffs. Management was forced to deal with expiring contracts of two star players, electing to sign Dustin Byfuglien to a five-year extension while trading team captain Andrew Ladd to the Chicago Blackhawks at the NHL trade deadline. Despite finishing with the sixth-worst record in the league, the Jets managed to win the second overall pick in the 2016 NHL Entry Draft through the draft lottery, which they used to select Finnish prospect Patrik Laine. Later that summer, the team appointed Blake Wheeler as their new captain.

Playoff years (2017–present)
In the 2017–18 season, the Jets clinched their second playoff spot since relocating from Atlanta, with the help of starting goaltender, Connor Hellebuyck. On March 25, 2018, the Jets beat the Nashville Predators 5–4 in a shootout, and clinched a spot in the 2018 Stanley Cup playoffs. On April 11, 2018, the Jets won the first playoff game in the history of the Atlanta/Winnipeg franchise when they defeated the Minnesota Wild 3–2. On April 20, 2018, the Jets won their first playoff series in franchise history (and the first series victory in 31 years for the city) with a 5–0 victory over the Minnesota Wild in game five of the First Round series, winning the series 4–1. On May 10, 2018, the Jets made further franchise history by advancing to the Western Conference Finals for the first time, defeating the Nashville Predators four games to three; Nashville were the defending holders of the Campbell Bowl Trophy from the previous season and holders of the Presidents' Trophy for most points in the league during the 2017–18 NHL season. This would also mark the first time that either iteration of the Winnipeg Jets had advanced beyond the second round of the playoffs. Facing the Vegas Golden Knights in the Western Conference Finals, the Jets defeated the Golden Knights in the first game of the series 4–2. However, the Jets went on to lose the Western Conference Finals, with the Golden Knights defeating the Jets in the following four games in the series. In 2019, the Jets clinched the playoffs, but lost to the eventual Stanley Cup champion St. Louis Blues in six games in the First Round.

The Jets struggled in the 2019–20 season due to the departure of many high-profile defencemen such as Jacob Trouba, Tyler Myers and Dustin Byfuglien, but were still in contention for a wild-card spot when the league shut down due to the COVID-19 pandemic. The Jets were awarded a playoff spot as part of the expanded format, but injuries to star forwards Mark Scheifele and Patrik Laine in the first game of their series against the Calgary Flames in the Qualifying Round handicapped the team and they were eliminated three games to one in the best-of-five series. Goaltender Connor Hellebuyck was also awarded the Vezina Trophy for being the league's best goaltender. The Jets won their fourth consecutive playoff berth in the 2020–21 season and swept the Edmonton Oilers in the First Round but were themselves swept in the Second Round by the Montreal Canadiens.

In the 2021–22 season, the Jets finished a disappointing sixth in the Central Division, missing the playoffs. At the start of the 2022–23 season, forward Blake Wheeler was stripped of the team captaincy.

Team information

Jerseys

No new logo and colours for the Jets accompanied the team's nickname announcement at the 2011 NHL Entry Draft (draft pick Mark Scheifele was presented with a generic black and silver NHL jersey and cap), but True North confirmed that they were in the process of conceiving a logo and colour scheme for the Jets, with True North's chairman, Mark Chipman, stating that the previous Jets' blue and red colours would be incorporated. The Jets unveiled their new logos and colours on July 22, 2011, three days before the team had scheduled to release them (this after team merchandise containers were broken into and a crude picture of a Jets' T-shirt made the rounds on the internet).

While blue and silver are the main colour palette, the insignias are a dramatic departure from the previous Jets' logos and pay homage to the Royal Canadian Air Force (RCAF), particularly Winnipeg's 17 Wing; the primary logo is patterned after the roundels used by the RCAF and includes a silhouette of a McDonnell Douglas CF-18 Hornet. (Red is a secondary part of the colour scheme due to a maple leaf, the incorporation of which came with the permission of the Toronto Maple Leafs.) Game uniforms for the new Jets were unveiled in September at 17 Wing; the team did not introduce a third jersey for its inaugural season due to a limited timetable.

The Jets kept their existing uniforms when Adidas took over production of NHL uniforms in 2017. Prior to the 2018–19 season, the Jets introduced their first alternate uniform, featuring aviator blue as the base colour, along with a new "Jets" wordmark, block letters and numbers, and striping inspired from the 1990–96 uniforms of the original Jets.

Even though the current Jets are not historically connected with the original franchise now known as the Arizona Coyotes, the team continued to pay tribute to its original incarnation on a few occasions. From 2016 to 2019, the Jets wore throwback white uniforms based on the 1973–78 design worn by the original Jets. The uniforms made its debut in the 2016 Heritage Classic and have been used during Jets Hall of Fame induction nights since. A blue version of the throwback uniforms was later unveiled, this time for the 2019 Heritage Classic. For the 2020–21 season, the Jets wore "Reverse Retro" alternate uniforms, recreating the original Jets' 1979–90 uniforms but recoloured to match the current Jets' scheme. In addition, the current Jets' 10th-anniversary logo in 2021 also served as a memorial logo to Dale Hawerchuk, whose no. 10 (in the original Jets' number and colour style) was added in lieu of the team's current logo following his death on August 18, 2020. Starting with the 2021–22 season, the Jets' blue "Heritage" uniforms were promoted to alternate status, replacing the previous aviator blue alternates. In the 2022–23 season, the Jets wore "Reverse Retro" uniforms based on the white uniforms worn by the original Jets from 1990 to 1996, again recoloured to the current Jets' scheme.

The logo was designed by Reebok, the NHL and designer Linda Lynch. Reebok's lead uniform and team identity designers, Dominique Fillion and Linda Lynch, have been associated with the identity design.

Mascot
True North announced they had "recalled" their former Moose mascot, Mick E. Moose, from the AHL. Mick E. had spent the past 15 seasons with the Manitoba Moose of the International and American hockey leagues, entertaining fans at Moose games and community events. Slight modifications to the costume were made, including a new vintage leather aviator helmet. Since the start of the 2015–16 season, Mick E. Moose has served as mascot for both the Jets and the Manitoba Moose. A fan favourite, he also averages over 100 community appearances per season in Winnipeg and rural Manitoba. In the 2016 Heritage Classic, the current Jets resurrected their mascot from its original incarnation, Benny, and has since served as the team's secondary mascot.

Traditions

National anthem
Beginning in 2011, during the singing of "O Canada", fans commonly shout the words "True North!" (in the line "The True North strong and free") to recognize True North Sports & Entertainment. Jennifer Hanson was the Jets' regular national anthem singer for the final seven seasons of the original franchise, and performed again during the 2016 Heritage Classic Alumni Game. Stacey Nattrass (who has been uniquely known as Your Winnipeg Jets' Own) has performed the anthems at the majority of home games since 2011.

Winnipeg Whiteout

The Winnipeg Whiteout is a hockey tradition that dates back to 1987 when fans of the original Jets franchise were asked to wear white clothing at the home playoff games. It was created as a response to the "C of Red" created by fans of the Calgary Flames, whom the Jets were facing in the first round of the 1987 Stanley Cup playoffs. The Jets eliminated the Flames in six games, and fans wore white for every home playoff game thereafter.

Fans of the former Jets AHL affiliate, the St. John's IceCaps, also continued this tradition, as did fans of the continuing franchise in Glendale, the Arizona Coyotes. It is referred to as the "Ice Cap's Whiteout" and "Coyotes Whiteout," respectively by IceCaps and Coyotes fans. The Whiteout was also used during the Canada vs Russia Gold medal game, at the 1999 World Junior Ice Hockey Championships, hosted by the city of Winnipeg. During the 2009 Calder Cup playoffs between the Manitoba Moose and the Hershey Bears, fans were asked to wear white for Game 6 of the Calder Cup Finals.

The Winnipeg Jets resurrected this tradition when they qualified for the 2015 Stanley Cup playoffs.

Season-by-season record
For the full season-by-season history, see List of Winnipeg Jets seasons

Note: GP = Games played, W = Wins, L = Losses, OT = Overtime losses, Pts = Points, GF = Goals for, GA = Goals against

Players and personnel

Current roster

Team captains
Note: This list does not include captains from the Atlanta Thrashers.
Andrew Ladd, 2011–2016
Blake Wheeler, 2016–2022

Head coaches

Note: This list does not include head coaches from the Atlanta Thrashers.

Team and league honours

Retired numbers
The previous Winnipeg Jets organization retired the jersey numbers of two players, while their successors, the Arizona Coyotes, have honoured the numbers of players who played for the former Jets. No numbers have been officially retired by the current franchise to date, although several members of the original franchise are honoured by the current Winnipeg Jets organization as part of its Hall of Fame (see below). 

The number 99 is retired league-wide in honour of Wayne Gretzky; this was done by the NHL at the 2000 NHL All-Star Game.

Retired/honoured by the original Winnipeg Jets/Arizona Coyotes
 #9 Bobby Hull: Upon relocation of the team from Atlanta in 2011, Evander Kane received permission from Hull to wear this number and did so until traded to the Buffalo Sabres in February 2015. Andrew Copp wore this number from 2015 to 2022.

 #10 Dale Hawerchuk: Bryan Little switched from number 10 to number 18 during the franchise relocation in 2011, out of respect for Hawerchuk. The current organization incorporated the number into its commemorative logo for the 2020–21 season which simultaneously celebrated the team's tenth season in Winnipeg and honored Hawerchuk, who died of cancer in August 2020.

 #25 Thomas Steen: This number was worn briefly by Zach Redmond and Brett MacLean. It was last worn by Paul Stastny, a close friend of Steen's son, Alex. Stastny chose the number in part because of Steen.

Honoured by the Atlanta Thrashers/current Winnipeg Jets
 #11 Rick Rypien: This number was not issued in honour of former Manitoba Moose player Rypien following the player's death shortly after signing with the Jets organization prior to the 2011–12 season. Nate Thompson was granted special permission to wear the honoured number after signing with the club for the 2020–21 season. The Jets and Moose also wear stickers bearing #11 on their helmets as part of the Project11 initiative in support of mental health awareness.

 #37 Dan Snyder: The Atlanta/Winnipeg organization did not issue this number between 2003 and 2016 following the death of Snyder in 2003. Goaltender Connor Hellebuyck has worn the number since 2016, having received the blessing of the Snyder family.

Winnipeg Jets Hall of Fame
The organization created the Winnipeg Jets Hall of Fame in 2016 to honour the impact and accomplishments of the original Winnipeg Jets, and the history of professional hockey in the city. The inaugural inductees were the "HOT Line" consisting of Anders Hedberg, Bobby Hull and Ulf Nilsson, who were inducted on October 19, 2016. Dale Hawerchuk was honoured on November 14, 2017. Lars-Erik Sjoberg and Ab McDonald were posthumously inducted on February 26, 2019. Both were captains of the team at key points of the original team's history, with the latter being the first-ever captain for the team and the former being the first captain for the team upon joining the NHL. Randy Carlyle and Thomas Steen were inducted on February 11, 2020, both serving as some of the longest tenured players in original Jets' history. Teemu Selanne and Teppo Numminen were inducted on November 17, 2022.

Franchise scoring leaders

These are the top-ten point, goal, and assist scorers in franchise history. Figures are updated after each completed NHL regular season.
  – current Jets player
Note: Pos = Position; GP = Games played; G = Goals; A = Assists; Pts = Points; P/G = Points per game

Single-season leaders

Most goals in a season: Ilya Kovalchuk, 52 (2005–06, 2007–08)
Most assists in a season: Blake Wheeler, 71 (2018–19)
Most points in a season: Marian Hossa, 100 (2006–07)
Most penalty minutes in a season: Jeff Odgers, 226 (2000–01)
Most goals in a season, defenceman: Dustin Byfuglien, 20 (2010–11, 2013–14)
Most points in a season, defenceman: Dustin Byfuglien, 56 (2013–14)
Most goals in a season, rookie: Patrik Laine, 36 (2016–17)
Most assists in a season, rookie: Dany Heatley, 41 (2001–02)
Most points in a season, rookie: Dany Heatley, 67 (2001–02)
Most wins in a season: Connor Hellebuyck, 44 (2017–18)
Most shutouts in a season: Connor Hellebuyck, 6 (2017–18)

Broadcasters

Bell Media served as the initial media rightsholder for the Jets, under a 10-year deal covering both radio and television.

TSN is the regional television broadcaster of the Jets for games not broadcast by Sportsnet; games are televised on TSN3 in Manitoba, Saskatchewan, Nunavut, the Northwest Territories (shared with the Calgary Flames and Edmonton Oilers outside of Manitoba), and parts of Northwestern Ontario (shared with the Toronto Maple Leafs). Initially, Jets games were carried on a dedicated feed of TSN in the team's market, "TSN Jets", which was sold as a subscription-based pay television service separate from the national TSN network. In 2014, with the realignment of TSN into regional feeds, Jets telecasts moved to TSN3 and the separate TSN Jets channel was discontinued. The team renewed its television rights with TSN3 on October 5, 2020.

Dan Robertson and Kevin Sawyer serve as the respective play-by-play announcer and colour commentator for Jets broadcasts on TSN3, with John Lu reporting at rinkside. Previously, Dennis Beyak served as the primary play-by-play voice for the Jets until his retirement at the end of the 2021–22 NHL season. Beyak's previous partners include Kevin Sawyer, Ray Ferraro, and Shane Hnidy. Hnidy was the team's lead colour commentator from the 2011–12 to 2016–17 seasons and has since moved to AT&T SportsNet Rocky Mountain to cover the Vegas Golden Knights in 2017.

Corus Entertainment has held the Jets radio rights since the 2020–21 season, as part of a seven-year agreement signed in 2020. CJOB and CJKR-FM Power 97 serve as co-flagships, simulcasting all games on AM and FM radio. Paul Edmonds and Mitch Thomas serve as on-air play-by-play team. CJOB historically served as the radio home for several periods of their original incarnation. (CJKR-FM solely airs Jets games in the event of scheduling conflicts with Winnipeg Blue Bombers football on CJOB.) CFRW, TSN Radio 1290, served as the flagship radio station of the team from 2011 to 2020, with Edmonds on play-by-play alongside Brian Munz. They were occasionally joined by Beyak, who took over radio play-by-play when TSN was not involved in the television broadcast. Munz also occasionally substituted for Beyak on TSN.

See also
 List of Atlanta Thrashers/Winnipeg Jets general managers
 List of Winnipeg Jets draft picks
 List of Winnipeg Jets players

References

External links
 
 

 
National Hockey League teams
2011 establishments in Manitoba
Central Division (NHL)
Ice hockey clubs established in 2011
National Hockey League in Manitoba
National Hockey League teams based in Canada